Maha Bayrakdar Al-Khal (alternatively: Bayraqdar, Bairakdar, Birqidar, Birdkar, born on 26 February 1947) is a Syrian-Lebanese poet and artist. Bayrakdar sketched and wrote poetry at an early age; she completed fine arts studies in her native Damascus before obtaining a business administration degree in Munich, Germany. In 1967, she won the Miss Syria beauty pageant. In 1970 Bayrakdar married the Lebanese-Syrian poet Yusuf al-Khal and has two children with him, Ward and Youssef, both of whom are acclaimed actors in the Middle East. 

Bayrakdar published four poetry books and is a prolific painter. In addition to poetry she writes and illustrates children's books and has written three television series, all of which feature her children in leading roles.

Early life and education 
Maha was born and raised in Damascus on 26 February 1947 to major Mohammad Khayr Bayrakdar, a police officer, and Nazmiyya al-Amin, a painter. She was the second-born among her four siblings. She attended the Khadija al-Kubra school in Damascus before her family started moving during her formative years due to the nature of her father's work. During the move, Bayrakdar was exposed to the beauty of the Syrian hinterland and began sketching and painting at an early age. Her first venture into poetry came at the age of 14. By the age of 15 she had read all of the Russian literature masterpieces; she was also interested in German literature. Bayrakdar expressed her wish to learn theater but her father forbade her. Subsequently, she joined the Department of Illustrations in the Institute of Fine Arts of Damascus, where she received her art education and graduated in 1967. She also graduated in business administration from the University of Munich in Germany in 1969.

Bayrakdar won the Miss Syria beauty pageant in 1967, an experience she avoids talking about.

Courtship and marriage 
Bayrakdar went to Lebanon to print a poetry book at the An-Nahar publishing press. At the An-Nahar offices, she met her future husband Yusuf al-Khal, who was 31 years her elder. Al-Khal was a poet, a writer, and an art critic who was responsible for the cultural section of the An-Nahar newspaper. Bayrakdar was instantly infatuated with him but was ired when Yusuf treated her with reserve and harshly criticized her work. Bayrakdar challenged al-Khal to read her poetry, which led him to meet her again and to express his fondness of her. 

In 1970 Bayrakdar married al-Khal. The couple had two children, Youssef (born on 8 September 1973) and Ward, both of whom are renowned actors. Bayrakdar, who was born and raised a Sunni Muslim, converted to Christianity. Despite Yusuf being a Protestant, the Khals baptized both of their children into the Maronite Catholic Church.

Career 
Bayrakdar's first poetry compilation that she submitted to An-Nahar was not published. Bayrakdar published a number of poetry books ʿeshbat al-Meleh (The Salt Herb, 1989), Rahil al-ʿanaser (The departure of the elements -1995), as-Samt (The silence - 2004), and Dawat ar-ruh (The cure of the soul - 2011). She wrote and illustrated children's books and wrote song lyrics. Bayrakdar and Yusuf al-Khal curated Beiruti art gallery Gallery One between 1970 and 1975.

Bayrakdar worked at National Syrian Radio and TV and in local Lebanese radio stations as a producer and presenter of cultural programs. Between 1980 and 1987 she edited and illustrated the Dar Assayad publishing house magazine Fairuz. She was editor-in-chief of the arts and interior design magazine Iwan, and also the editor-in-chief of the intellectual, cultural and artistic magazine Al-Jidar. In 2008 Bayrakdar wrote the television drama series Al-ta'er al-maksour (The broken bird) in which both her children have leading roles; the series garnered praise with a rating of 4.3/5 by elCinema website critics. In 2010 and 2013 respectively she wrote Noktet Hobb (A drop of love) and Kharej Az-Zaman (Beyond time) which featured both Ward and Youssef in leading roles.

Views 
Bayrakdar does not ascribe to feminist literature and refuses to put any labels on literary works. She criticized Lebanese drama shows for their monotony and lack of creative diversity.

Exhibitions 
Bayrakdar has held 15 solo exhibitions and 37 collective exhibitions and numerous poetry reading events in Lebanon, Syria, Iraq, and the Arabian Gulf countries. Only 4 of her exhibitions were held in her native Syria, the last of which was before the beginning of the Syrian civil war in 2011.

Awards and recognition 
On 11 June 2004 Bayrakdar was decorated with the Order of Merit medal by Lebanese president Emile Lahoud. She was also awarded a recognition plaque from the Lebanese Army commandership.

References

Citations

Sources

External links 

Highlighted painting of Maha Bayrakdar paintings on the Lebanese National Virtual Museum of Modern Art website

1947 births
Living people
Lebanese poets
Syrian poets
Lebanese painters
Syrian painters
Lebanese women writers
21st-century Lebanese poets
21st-century women writers
Recipients of the Order of Merit (Lebanon)